Charles Kramer is an American television Co-Executive Producer and Editor who has worked on shows such as Discovery's Street Outlaws, BET's Real Husbands of Hollywood, MTV's The Osbournes - Newlyweds: Nick and Jessica - Rich Girls - The Ashlee Simpson Show - Duets, NBC's The Sing-Off and Escape Routes, TNT's The Great Escape, ABC's Dancing with the Stars, Bravo's Top Chef and Kathy Griffin: My Life on the D-List, and CBS's Big Brother.  A University of Miami graduate, Kramer created Film Art Revolution which became a local film festival showcasing student films with live, improvised soundtracks.  He began his career working with renowned trailer editor Thomas Swords.  Together they worked on "Swingers," "Lost Highway," "Freebird; The Movie," and "Kolya."   In 2013, Kramer was elected to the Motion Picture Editors Guild Board of Directors.

References

American television editors
American television producers
Living people
Year of birth missing (living people)